Kalateh-ye Jabbar (also Romanized as Kalāteh-ye Jabbār; also known as Jabbār) is a village in Qalandarabad Rural District, Qalandarabad District, Fariman County, Razavi Khorasan Province, Iran. At the 2006 census, its population was 57, in 12 families.

References 

Populated places in Fariman County